Walkerton District Community School is a public K–12 school in Walkerton, Ontario, Canada.

History
In 2008, the Bluewater District School Board released their plans for a combined K–12 school to replace Brant Central, Walkerton Public and Walkerton District Secondary schools. In September 2012, the new Walkerton District Community School opened.

See also
List of high schools in Ontario

References

2012 establishments in Ontario
Educational institutions established in 2012
Elementary schools in Ontario
High schools in Ontario
Schools in Bruce County